The Assembly of the Autonomous Island of Anjouan is the island's legislative body.

Elections

2004
The Assembly, formed following elections held on 14 and 21 March 2004, has a total of 25 members. Supporters of the Island President, Mohamed Bacar, won 20 seats while supporters of Union President Azali Assoumani won 5.

See also
Assembly of the Union of the Comoros
Assemblies of the Autonomous Islands of the Comoros
Assembly of the Autonomous Island of Grande Comore
Assembly of the Autonomous Island of Mohéli

Politics of the Comoros
Political organizations based in the Comoros
Government of the Comoros
Anjouan
Anjouan
Anjouan